was the governor of Kumamoto Prefecture in Japan from 2001 to 2009. She was Kumamoto's first female governor and the second in Japanese history.

She is a member of the Japan Evangelical Lutheran Church.

References 

1939 births
Living people
People from Saga Prefecture
Governors of Kumamoto Prefecture
Female Japanese governors
Japanese Lutherans